USS Acoma has been the name of more than one United States Navy ship, and may refer to:

 , a patrol boat in commission from 1917 to 1918
 , tug in service from 1946 to 1985

United States Navy ship names